Michael Owen is an English former footballer.

Michael Owen may also refer to:
Mickey Owen (1916–2005), baseball player
Sir Michael Owen (psychiatrist) (fl. 1977–2020), Welsh research scientist in the area of neurology
Michael Owen (politician) (born 1962), former Australian politician
Michael Owen (rugby union) (born 1980), Welsh rugby union player
Michael S. Owen (fl. 2010–2013), former United States Ambassador to Sierra Leone

See also
Michael Owens (disambiguation)